Connie Chan may refer to:

Connie Chan (actor) (born 1947), Chinese actor
Connie Chan (politician) (born 1978), California politician